The 2nd International Emmy Kids Awards ceremony, presented by the International Academy of Television Arts and Sciences (IATAS) took place on February 10, 2014 in New York City. The nominations were announced on October 3, 2013.

Ceremony information
Nominations for the 2nd International Emmy Kids Awards were announced by the International Academy of Television Arts and Sciences (IATAS) during a press conference at MIPCOM in Cannes, France.  The winners were announced on February 10, 2014 at a ceremony in New York City. The winning programs came from Brazil, Canada, and the United Kingdom.

Winners

References

External links 
 International Academy of Television Arts and Sciences website

International Emmy Kids Awards ceremonies
International Emmy Kids Awards
International Emmy Kids Awards
International Emmy Kids Awards
International Emmy Kids Awards
International Emmy Kids Awards